Steve Brewer (born February 2, 1957) is an American author of mystery, detective and crime novels. His novel Lonely Street was made into the Hollywood film of the same name, starring Robert Patrick, Jay Mohr and Joe Mantegna.

Biography

Writing 
Brewer was a journalist for 22 years, writing for the Arkansas Gazette, Associated Press, and Albuquerque Journal. He continued to write a weekly syndicated humor column for 10 more years, many of them collected in the book Trophy Husband.

Brewer switched to fiction with the publication of his first novel, Lonely Street in 1994. He has published 34 books, including three under the pen name Max Austin. Ten of his novels, including Lonely Street, feature bumbling Albuquerque private eye Bubba Mabry.

Teaching 
Brewer teaches writing at the Honors College of the University of New Mexico.

He has also taught classes at the Midwest Writers Workshop, SouthWest Writers, and the Tony Hillerman Writers Seminar, and regularly speaks at mystery conventions.

Bookstore 
In 2018, Brewer opened Organic Books, an independent bookstore in Albuquerque, NM, with his wife Kelly and sons Max and Seth.

Published works

Novels 
 Lonely Street (1994), Pocket Books
 Baby Face (1995), Pocket Books
 Witchy Woman (1996), St. Martin's Press
 Shaky Ground (1997), St. Martin's Press
 Dirty Pool (1999), St. Martin's Press
 End Run (2000), Intrigue Press
 Crazy Love (2001), Intrigue Press
 Cheap Shot (2002), Intrigue Press
 Bullets (2003), Intrigue Press
 Fool's Paradise (2003), UNM Press
 Boost (2004), Speck Press
 Bank Job (2005), Intrigue Press
 Whipsaw (2006), Intrigue Press
 Monkey Man (2006), Intrigue Press
 Cutthroat (2007), Bleak House
 Firepower (2010), Amazon
 1500 Rules for Successful Living (2011), Amazon
 Calabama (2011), Amazon
 The Big Wink (2011), Amazon
 Lost Vegas (2011), Amazon
 A Box of Pandoras (2012), Amazon
 Duke City Split (as Max Austin) (2014), Alibi 
 Duke City Hit (as Max Austin) (2014), Alibi 
 Duke City Desperado (as Max Austin) (2015), Alibi
 Shotgun Boogie (2016), Amazon
 Homesick Blues (2016), Amazon
 Side Eye (2017), Amazon
 Cold Cuts (2018), Amazon
 Upshot (2020), Amazon
 Trouble Town (2021), Amazon

Short fiction 
 "Sanity Clause" (novella), in The Last Noel (2004), Worldwide
 "Payoff" (short story) in Damn Near Dead (2006), Busted Flush Press
 "Limbo" (short story), in the Mystery Writers of America anthology Crimes by Moonlight (2010), Berkley
 "Surf City" (short story), in West Coast Crime Wave (2011), Amazon
 "Showdown" (short story) (2012), Amazon
 "Found Money" (short story) (2012), Amazon
 "Party Doll" (novella) (2012), Amazon
 "Yvonne's Gone" (short story) (2012), Amazon
 "Cemetery Plot" (short story) (2013), Amazon (reprinted in the 2019 anthology Knucklehead Noir, Coffin Hop Press)
 "Up the Chimney"" (short story) in It's a Weird Winter Wonderland (2017), Coffin Hop Press
 "Babbling Brook" (short story) in Trouble & Strife (2019), Down and Out Books
 "Black Friday" (short story) in A Beast Without A Name (2019), Down and Out Books

Humor 
 Trophy Husband (2003), University of New Mexico Press
 Rules for Successful Living (2020), Amazon

Recognition 
Brewer served two years on the national board of Mystery Writers of America and twice served as an Edgar Awards judge. He is also a member of International Thriller Writers and SouthWest Writers.

See also 
 Lonely Street

References

External links 

 The Home Front, Steve Brewer's blog and homepage
 
 Steve Brewer reviews at Kirkus
 Steve Brewer reviews at Publishers Weekly
 Upshot review at the Albuquerque Journal
 Shotgun Boogie review at the Albuquerque Journal

American male novelists
American mystery writers
University of New Mexico faculty
University of Arkansas alumni
Writers from New Mexico
20th-century American novelists
21st-century American novelists
Living people
1957 births